"The Witness for the Prosecution" is a short story and play by British author Agatha Christie. The story was initially published as "Traitor's Hands" in Flynn's, a weekly pulp magazine, in the edition of 31 January 1925.

In 1933, the story was published for the first time as "The Witness for the Prosecution" in the collection The Hound of Death that appeared only in the United Kingdom. In 1948, it was finally published in the United States under that title in the collection The Witness for the Prosecution and Other Stories. The story has been adapted for stage, film and television.

Plot
Leonard Vole is arrested for the murder of Emily French, a wealthy older woman. Unaware that he was a married man, Miss French made him her principal heir, casting suspicion on Leonard. When his wife, Romaine, agrees to testify, she does so not in Leonard's defence but as a witness for the prosecution. Romaine's decision is part of a complicated plan to free her husband. She first gives the prosecution its strongest evidence, then fabricates new evidence that discredits her testimony, believing, correctly as it turns out, that her impeachment as an unfaithful wife would improve Leonard's chances of acquittal far more than her testimony for the defence. It is then revealed that Leonard Vole actually did kill Emily French.

Alterations
The original short story ended abruptly with the major twist—Romaine's revelation that Leonard Vole was indeed guilty. Over time, Christie grew dissatisfied with this abrupt and dystopian ending (one of the few Christie endings in which a murderer escapes punishment), which would have had to be sanitised in any event for stage and film versions where such a brutal crime going unpunished would have been unthinkable at the time.

In her subsequent rewriting of the story as a play she added a young mistress for Leonard, who does not appear until the end of the play. The mistress and Leonard are about to leave Romaine (called "Christine" in all film and television versions, and most stage productions after the original Broadway production, until the 2016 television version) to be arrested for perjury, when Romaine grabs a knife and stabs and kills Leonard. She will be defended by the same attorney she tricked into getting Leonard acquitted in the first place. This remained the standard production format until Sarah Phelps' 2016 television version, which restored the original ending but changed the fates of other characters.

Characters (play) 
 Leonard Vole, the accused
 Emily French, the victim
 Janet Mackenzie, Emily French's maid
 Romaine (subsequently renamed as Christine) Heilger/Vole, "wife" of the accused 
 Mr Mayhew / Mayherne, the solicitor of the accused
 Sir Wilfrid Robarts, QC, senior counsel of the accused
 Mr Myers, QC, the Crown prosecutor
 Mr Justice Wainwright, the judge
 Inspector Hearne, the arresting officer
 Greta, Sir Wilfrid's typist
 Carter, Sir Wilfrid's clerk

Publishing history
 1925: Flynn's Weekly, 31 January – as Traitor's Hands
 1933: The Hound of Death
 1948: The Witness for the Prosecution and Other Stories
 1993: The Mousetrap & Other Plays

In other media

Theatre

 Witness for the Prosecution was adapted as a play by Agatha Christie. The play opened in London on 28 October 1953 at the Winter Garden Theatre, produced by Peter Saunders, and directed by Wallace Douglas. The premiere cast included Derek Blomfield as Leonard Vole, Patricia Jessel as Romaine Vole, and David Horne as Sir Wilfrid Robarts.
 2002 Свидетель обвинения (Russia)
 2005 Khara Sangaycha Tar (Marathi)
 2011 (検察側の証人 [Kensatsugawa no shonin] ) Witness for the Prosecution (Japan)
 2018 "奪命証人" Witness for the Prosecution by Carina Lau, Paul Chun Pui and Tse Kwan Ho (Hong Kong)
 2018 Tomar Kono Satyo Nei (Bengali)

Film
 A film version of Witness for the Prosecution premiered in 1957 (and reached general release in early 1958), with Tyrone Power as Leonard Vole, Marlene Dietrich as Christine Vole and Charles Laughton as Sir Wilfrid Robarts Q.C. The film was adapted by Larry Marcus, Harry Kurnitz and the film's director, Billy Wilder. The play opened on Broadway on December 16, 1954.
 In August 2016, Variety reported that Ben Affleck was in talks to direct and star in a remake of Witness for the Prosecution. Christopher Keyser was to write the script, and Affleck would produce, with Matt Damon, Jennifer Todd and the Agatha Christie estate. The project was never realized.
 The 2016 BBC TV mini series  was also issued as a standalone film.

Television
  BBC Television produced Witness for the Prosecution in 1949, with Dale Rogers as Leonard Vole, Mary Kerridge as Romaine Vole and Derek Elphinstone as Sir Wilfrid Robarts Q.C. This version was directed by John Glyn-Jones and adapted by Sidney Budd.
 Witness for the Prosecution was next adapted for NBC, also in 1949, with Nicholas Saunders as Leonard Vole. This version aired as part of The Chevrolet Tele-Theatre, and was directed by Gordon Duff. 
 The 7 November 1950 episode of the CBS anthology series Danger was an adaptation of this story. It was directed by Yul Brynner. 
 CBS produced a second adaptation of Witness for the Prosecution in 1953, with Tom Drake as Leonard Vole, Andrea King as Romaine Vole and Edward G. Robinson as Sir Wilfrid Robarts Q.C. This version, which aired as part of the anthology series Lux Video Theatre, was directed by Richard Goode and adapted by Anne Howard Bailey.
 Hallmark television produced Witness for the Prosecution in 1982, with Beau Bridges as Leonard Vole, Diana Rigg as Christine Vole and Ralph Richardson as Sir Wilfrid Robarts Q.C. This version was based on the Billy Wilder movie with adaptions by John Gay, and was directed by Alan Gibson.
 The BBC produced another two-part version of The Witness for the Prosecution for Christmas 2016 and first broadcast on 26 and 27 December, with Kim Cattrall as Emily French, Billy Howle as Leonard Vole, Andrea Riseborough as Romaine Heilger, Toby Jones as John Mayhew, and David Haig as Sir Charles Carter.

References

External links
 Flynn's Weekly at Galactic Central

1925 short stories
British plays adapted into films
Plays by Agatha Christie
Works originally published in American magazines

es:Testigo de cargo (libro)